Storm Boy is a 1964 Australian children's novel written by Colin Thiele, about a boy and his pelican. The story, set in the Coorong region of South Australia, focuses on the relationships the boy has with his father Hide-Away Tom, the pelican, and an outcast Australian Aboriginal man called Fingerbone.

The story has been dramatised several times. The 1976 film adaptation Storm Boy won the Jury and Best Film prizes at the 1977 AFI Awards.

Plot summary 
Storm Boy likes to wander alone along the fierce deserted coast among the dunes that face out into the Southern Ocean. After a pelican mother is shot, Storm Boy rescues the three baby pelicans and nurses them back to health. He names them Mr Proud, Mr Ponder and Mr Percival. After he releases them, his favourite, Mr Percival, returns. The story then concentrates on the conflict between his lifestyle, the externally imposed requirement for him to attend a school, the fate of the pelican, and the relationship of the boy, and later his father, with Fingerbone.

Adaptations 
The 1976 film adaptation Storm Boy won both the Jury Prize and Best Film at the 1977 Australian Film Institute Awards. The film starred David Gulpilil in the role of Finger Bone and Greg Rowe in the title role. The film was advertised with the tagline "Every year has its special film, this year it's...Storm Boy".

An audio dramatisation was made in 1994. The Bell Shakespeare Company toured Australia with the play Storm Boy in 1996, with Trent Atkinson in the title role.

The Sydney Theatre Company performed Tom Holloway's stage adaptation in 2013 and 2015 in collaboration with Perth's Barking Gecko Theatre Company, Trevor Jamieson played Fingerbone Bill in the 2013 production, while Jimi Bani played the character in 2015 (apart from three performances, where Shaka Cook stood in owing to an unforeseen family commitment).

A children's video game by the name of Storm Boy: The Game, following the story and including a few mini-games based on its events, was released in late 2018 on several platforms.

A second movie adaptation, starring Geoffrey Rush, Jai Courtney, with Trevor Jamieson reprising his role as Fingerbone Bill, was released in January 2019.

References

External links 

1964 Australian novels
1964 children's books
Australian children's novels
Australian novels adapted into films
Australian novels adapted into plays
Novels adapted into video games
Books about birds
Fictional pelicans
Novels set in South Australia